The Hanoi Marathon (also known as the VPBank Hanoi Marathon, formerly known as Hanoi International Heritage Marathon) is a marathon event hosted annually in Hanoi, the capital of Vietnam. Beginning in 2018, the marathon has attracted professional and recreational runners, both foreign and Vietnamese, thanks to its unique course that runs though the Old Quarter of the city.  

The marathon's loop course connects various city landmarks, beginning at the Ba Kieu Temple and ending at the Ly Thai To Park at the central lake of Hoan Kiem.

History 
Making its debut on October 21st, 2018, the Hanoi International Heritage Marathon attracted more than 2,600 runners. 

In 2019, the race was renamed the VPBank Hanoi Marathon after VPBank, a Vietnamese private bank, became the main sponsor of the event. The race also received certificates from IAAF and AIMS for its running course along with the AIMS membership.  

In 2020, despite the COVID-19 pandemic, the marathon organizers went ahead to host the race on 18 October with several modifications in order to ensure runners' safety. The  distance had its start time at 12:00 am, making the marathon the first midnight race in Vietnam. The marathon organizers changed the race's schedule to make sure runners were safe to attend the competition amid the pandemic. The start time for the full marathon was set at 12:00 am, and that for the  distance was also moved to 3:00 am, or two hours earlier than in 2018. While many foreign runners could not come to Vietnam to join the marathon, the race still attracted nearly 6,000 athletes to compete directly in Hanoi, while thousands more from elsewhere joined the online marathon.     

In addition, since Vietnam took turn to chair ASEAN activities in 2020, the Hanoi Marathon was selected as the official sports event of the year and launched as the VPBank Hanoi Marathon ASEAN 2020.

The course is certified by the World Athletics and receives Grade A measurers of the Association of International Marathons and Distance Races (AIMS). The marathon is on the event calendar of the Vietnam Athletics Federation (VAF) and an official member of AIMS.

Organization 
The marathon's Organizing Committee includes DHA Vietnam, a Hanoi-based professional event-hosting company, and the Hanoi People's Committee, the municipal government.

DHA Vietnam 
DHA Vietnam Ltd., established in 2012, is a Hanoi-based limited liability company (LLC) which specializes in technology transfer, advertising, and event management. Since its first year, the company has been responsible for many successful sports events and professional conferences based in Vietnam, like Halong International Heritage Marathon, Happy Colour Run, Thang Long International Conference on Cardiology 2018, and FIG Working Week 2019. The company has also partnered with many international organizations like the World Bank and UNESCO.

Race 
Runners can compete in four distances: full marathon, half marathon, the  run, and the  fun run.

Annually, the marathon is held on the Sunday of the third week of October. Since it's Hanoi's autumn at the time, the race day would have fairly cool and dry weather.

Course 
The Hanoi's marathon loop course starts at the Ba Kieu Temple, while the finish line for all its four distances is set in front of the King Ly Thai To Park by the Hoan Kiem lake. 

The Hanoi Marathon's route runs past many of the city's landmarks such as Hanoi Old Quarters, the Temple of Literature, West Lake, Ho Chi Minh Mausoleum, Hanoi's Flag Tower and Long Bien Bridge.

References 

Marathons in Asia